PAWG may refer to: 

 Pennsylvania Wing Civil Air Patrol, the highest echelon of the Civil Air Patrol in the commonwealth of Pennsylvania
 Wrangell Airport, whose ICAO airport code is PAWG